The 1940 Texas Mines Miners football team was an American football team that represented Texas School of Mines (now known as University of Texas at El Paso) as a member of the Border Conference during the 1940 college football season. In its 12th season under head coach Mack Saxon, the team compiled a 4–4–1 record (3–1–1 against Border Conference opponents), finished third in the conference, and outscored opponents by a total of 129 to 121.

Schedule

References

Texas Mines
UTEP Miners football seasons
Texas Mines Miners football